The Hasselborg Lake South Shelter Cabin is a historic backcountry shelter in the Admiralty Island National Monument, part of the Tongass National Forest in Southeast Alaska.  It is one of a number of such facilities built by Civilian Conservation Corps (CCC) on the Admiralty Island Canoe Route between 1933 and 1937.  The cabin is located on the southwest of Hasselborg Lake, north of the Hasselborg Cabin, and near the portage trail leading to Lake Guerin.  As built by the CCC, it was a three-sided Adirondack-style log shelter with shake walls and roof.  Sills and the lower ends of its posts have been replaced due to rot.

The cabin was listed on the National Register of Historic Places in 1995.

See also
National Register of Historic Places listings in Hoonah-Angoon Census Area, Alaska

References

Buildings and structures completed in 1935
Civilian Conservation Corps in Alaska
Log cabins in the United States
Buildings and structures on the National Register of Historic Places in Hoonah–Angoon Census Area, Alaska
Park buildings and structures on the National Register of Historic Places in Alaska
Tongass National Forest
Log buildings and structures on the National Register of Historic Places in Alaska
1935 establishments in Alaska